Chionodes tarmes is a moth in the family Gelechiidae. It is found in North America, where it has been recorded from Michigan, Maine, southern Quebec, Illinois and North Carolina.

References

Chionodes
Moths described in 1999
Moths of North America